Alma Rubens (born Alma Genevieve Reubens; February 19, 1897 – January 21, 1931) was an American film actress and stage performer.

Rubens began her career in the mid 1910s. She quickly rose to stardom in 1916 after appearing opposite Douglas Fairbanks in The Half-Breed. For the remainder of the decade, she appeared in supporting roles in comedies and drama. In the 1920s, Rubens developed a drug addiction which eventually ended her career. She died of lobar pneumonia and bronchitis shortly after being arrested for cocaine possession in January 1931.

Early life
Alma Genevieve Reubens was born on February 19, 1897, to John B. and Theresa (née Hayes) Reubens in San Francisco, California. Her father, John Reubens, born in 1857 in Germany, was Jewish, and emigrated to the United States in 1890. Alma vehemently denied any Jewish heritage throughout her lifetime however. Her mother was of Irish Catholic descent. She and her elder sister, Hazel (born 1893) were raised in their mother's faith and attended Sacred Heart Convent in San Francisco.

Some biographies erroneously state that her birth name was Genevieve Driscoll. That name was in fact a pseudonym that she later used in a non-professional capacity, as Genevieve was her middle name and Driscoll was her maternal grandmother's maiden name.

Career

Her first stage opportunity came when a chorus girl in a musical comedy theater troupe became ill. Rubens was chosen to take her place and joined the troupe as a regular performer. There she met Franklyn Farnum who was also a member. He later convinced Rubens to leave the troupe and try film acting.

In 1916, Rubens signed with Triangle Film Corporation. Her first film for the company was the comedy-drama Reggie Mixes In, starring Douglas Fairbanks. Later the same year, Rubens was re-teamed with Fairbanks for cocaine comedy The Mystery of the Leaping Fish, The Half-Breed and The Americano. The next year, Rubens co-starred in two westerns, Truthful Tolliver with William S. Hart and The Firefly of Tough Luck with Charles Gunn. In 1918, she announced that she was changing the spelling of her last name of Rueben to "Rubens" because it caused too much confusion in the movie industry and in publications. She later told Photoplay magazine, "As a matter of fact my name is not the same [spelling] as the painter's. It's either Reubens or Ruebens—I forget which. I never could spell it. Couldn't remember where the 'e' came. So I let it go Rubens."

In 1920, Rubens signed with William Randolph Hearst's Cosmopolitan Productions. The studio promoted Rubens as its newest starlet, falsely claiming she was a descendant of Flemish painter Peter Paul Rubens. Her first film for the studio was Humoresque, which became the studio's only hit that year. Later that year, she starred in dramas The World and His Wife, opposite Montague Love, and Thoughtless Women, both of which further solidified her popularity. By 1921, Rubens had developed an addiction to heroin after she was prescribed morphine by a doctor for a physical ailment. Due to her drug use and difficult behavior on set, William Randolph Hearst removed her from a film she was set to star in but kept her on the payroll for the next two years. There were rumors that Hearst continued to pay her a salary because the two were involved romantically. Hearst denied this rumor, claiming he continued to pay Rubens because he had invested a substantial amount of money promoting her as the studio's leading lady and that good lead actresses were difficult to find. Rubens returned to the screen in 1922 with roles in Find the Woman and The Valley of Silent Men. Her final film for Cosmopolitan Productions was the historical drama Under the Red Robe in 1923. Hearst released Ruben from her contract the same year.

In 1924, she starred in The Price She Paid for Columbia Pictures Corporation and had a supporting role in the Associated First National production Cytherea. From 1925 to 1926, she worked for Fox Film Corporation. While at Fox, she starred in the hit melodrama East Lynne (1925) opposite Edmund Lowe and Lou Tellegen. She also had roles in The Gilded Butterfly with Bert Lytell and Siberia (both 1926), the latter of which re-teamed Rubens with Edmund Lowe and Lou Tellegen. Her final film for Fox was 1927's Heart of Salome, after which she decided to work freelance.

Drug abuse and decline
By late 1927, Rubens' drug addiction severely impacted her career as she frequently was admitted to sanitariums for treatment for months at a time.  One of her latter roles was as Julie in the 1929 part-sound film version of Show Boat, her next-to-last film roles and one of her few sound films. The soundtrack for the portion in which she spoke, however, has apparently been lost.

In February 1929, Rubens' addiction became known publicly when she attempted to stab a physician who was taking her to a sanitarium for treatment. She was ordered to undergo treatment at the Spadra facility shortly thereafter. She later escaped despite being under the watch of four nurses and two male guards. She then was admitted to a sanatorium in Pasadena but left after 10 days. On May 15, 1929, Rubens' husband Ricardo Cortez and her mother had Rubens committed to Patton State Hospital for treatment after she resumed her drug habit. Rubens was released from Patton State Hospital in late December 1929.

She made her first public appearance since her release on January 30, 1930, in a role in a play produced at the Writer's Club in Hollywood. Her performance was well received by the audience, and she received eight curtain calls. After the show, Rubens gave an interview to United Press stating that she was cured of her addiction. During the interview, she described her descent into drug abuse and her experiences at the sanatoriums.

In early February 1930, Rubens traveled to New York where she announced she was now free of drug addiction and planning a comeback with a vaudeville tour in the East. She made an appearance on stage with her husband, but returned to California the same month. She was there less than two weeks when, on January 5, 1931, she was arrested by Federal officers in San Diego for cocaine possession and conspiracy to smuggle morphine from Mexico into the United States. Rubens claimed she was being framed, and physicians attested to her statements that she was not taking drugs. She later was released on $5,000 bail, and appeared for a preliminary hearing the second week of January 1931.

Personal life

Rubens married three times. Her first marriage was to actor Franklyn Farnum, nearly 20 years her senior, in June 1918. Rubens and Farnum were married secretly and separated about two months later. According to Rubens' divorce petition, Farnum physically abused her and once dislocated her jaw. Their divorce was finalized in December 1919. In November 1923, she married Dr. Daniel Carson Goodman, an author and film producer. They separated in late 1924, and Rubens filed for divorce in January 1925.

Rubens third and final marriage was to actor Ricardo Cortez, whom she married on January 30, 1926, in Riverside, California. As her divorce from Goodman was not yet finalized, the new marriage was considered invalid. They were remarried on February 8.

While touring the vaudeville circuit in mid-1930, the couple separated. At the time of her death, Rubens was suing Cortez for divorce. Cortez claimed he had not been notified of his wife's death, and later remarked that he had not seen her for several months and was unaware that she was seriously ill.

Death
Shortly after her release from jail on charges of cocaine possession, Rubens contracted a cold that quickly developed into lobar pneumonia and bronchitis. She fell into a coma at the Los Angeles home of her friend, Dr. Charles J. Pflueger. She died on January 21, 1931, at the age of 33 having never regained consciousness. A funeral service was held on January 24 at the Little Church of the Flowers at Forest Lawn Memorial Park, Glendale. Her body was then shipped to Fresno where a second service was held at the Christian Science Church on January 26. She is interred in a mausoleum at Mountain View Cemetery in Fresno.

For her contribution to the motion picture industry, Alma Rubens has a star on the Hollywood Walk of Fame located at 6409 Hollywood Blvd.

In popular culture
This Bright World Again, Rubens' memoirs, was serialized in national newspapers in 1931. The text details Rubens' career and her struggle with drug addiction. The full text, with a biography and filmography by Gary D. Rhodes and Alexander Webb titled Alma Rubens, Silent Snowbird: Her Complete 1930 Memoir, with a New Biography and Filmography, was published by McFarland in 2006.

Filmography

Footnotes

References

Further reading

External links

 
 Alma Rubens at Virtual History
 Motion Picture, September 1925 cover(archived)
 Find a Grave

1897 births
1931 deaths
20th-century American actresses
Actresses from San Francisco
American film actresses
20th-century American memoirists
American people of German-Jewish descent
American people of Irish descent
American Roman Catholics
American silent film actresses
American stage actresses
Burials in California
Deaths from bronchitis
Deaths from pneumonia in California
Vaudeville performers
Western (genre) film actresses
American women memoirists